Herbert Butros Khaury (April 12, 1932  November 30, 1996), also known as Herbert Buckingham Khaury, and known professionally as Tiny Tim, was an American singer, ukulele player, and musical archivist. He is best remembered for his 1968 hit "Tiptoe Through the Tulips", which he sang in a falsetto voice.

Early life
Khaury was born in Manhattan, New York City, on April 12, 1932. His mother Tillie (née Staff), a Polish-Jewish garment worker, was the daughter of a rabbi. She had immigrated from Brest-Litovsk, present-day Belarus, as a teen in 1914. Khaury's father, Butros Khaury, was a textile worker from Beirut, present-day Lebanon, whose father was a Maronite Catholic priest.

Khaury displayed musical talent at a very young age. At the age of five, his father gave him a vintage wind-up gramophone and a 78-RPM record of "Beautiful Ohio" by Henry Burr. He would sit for hours listening to the record. At the age of six, he began teaching himself guitar. By his pre-teen years, he developed a passion for records, specifically those from the 1900s through the 1930s. He began spending most of his free time at the New York Public Library, reading about the history of the phonograph industry and its first recording artists. He researched sheet music, often making photographic copies to take home to learn, a hobby he continued for his entire life. He attended George Washington High School in Washington Heights, Manhattan.

Khaury was a devout Catholic.

Life and career

By the time Khaury was 11 years old, he began learning to play the violin and enjoyed performing at home for his parents' entertainment. He later picked up the mandolin and the ukulelethe latter of which became his signature instrument. During recovery from having his appendix removed in 1945, he read the Bible and listened to music on the radio; after his recovery, he rarely left his room except to go to school, where he was described as a mediocre student. He dropped out of high school after continuously repeating his sophomore year, taking a series of menial jobs.

In a 1968 interview on The Tonight Show, he described the discovery of his ability to sing in an upper register: "I was listening to the radio and singing along; as I was singing I said 'Gee, it's strange. I can go up high as well.'" In a 1969 interview he said he was listening to Rudy Vallée sing in a falsetto, and "had something of a revelationI never knew that I had another top register," describing it as a religious experience.

By the early 1950s, Khaury had landed a job as a messenger at the New York office of Metro-Goldwyn-Mayer Studios, where he became ever more fascinated with the entertainment industry. He then entered a local talent show and sang "You Are My Sunshine" in his newly discovered falsetto. He started performing at dance club amateur nights under different names, such as Texarkana Tex, Judas K. Foxglove, Vernon Castle, and Emmett Swink. To stand out from the crowd of performers, he wore wild clothing and, after seeing an old poster of a long-haired Rudolph Valentino, grew his own hair out to shoulder length and wore pasty white facial makeup. His mother did not understand Herbert's change in appearance and was intending to take her son, now in his twenties, to see a psychiatrist at Bellevue Hospital until his father stepped in.

In 1959, he dropped all his other stage names and performed as "Larry Love, the Singing Canary" at Hubert's Museum and Live Flea Circus in New York City's Times Square. While performing there, he signed with a manager who sent him on auditions throughout the Greenwich Village section of New York, where he performed unpaid amateur gigs, playing the ukulele and singing in his falsetto voice the song which became his signature, "Tiptoe Through the Tulips".

Film critic Roger Ebert wrote:
I first saw Tiny Tim very early in his career, in Greenwich Village in the winter of 1962–63. There was a convention of college newspaper editors, and a few of usI remember Jeff Greenfield coming alongwent to the Black Pussycat and found ourselves being entertained by a man the likes of whom we'd not seen before. He was already locally popular.

In 1963, he landed his first paying gig at Page 3, a gay and lesbian club in Greenwich Village, playing 6 hours a night and 6 nights a week for $96 per month. For the next two years, he performed as "Dary Dover", and after that, "Sir Timothy Timms". After being booked to follow a "midget" act, his manager, George King, billed the  Khaury using the ironic stage name "Tiny Tim", which would later become his signature name.

Tiny Tim appeared in Jack Smith's Normal Love (1963), as well as the independent feature film You Are What You Eat (1968) in which he sang the Ronettes song "Be My Baby" in his falsetto range; also featured was a rendition of Sonny and Cher's "I Got You Babe", with Tim singing the Cher parts in his falsetto voice, along with Eleanor Barooshian singing Sonny Bono's baritone part. These tracks were recorded with musicians who later joined The Band. The "I Got You Babe" performance led to a booking on the premiere episode of Rowan and Martin's Laugh-In, a popular American television comedy-variety show. Co-host Dan Rowan announced that Laugh-In believed in showcasing new talent, and so Tiny Tim was introduced. The singer entered carrying a shopping bag, pulled his Martin soprano ukulele from it, and sang a medley of "A-Tisket, A-Tasket" and "On the Good Ship Lollipop" as an apparently genuinely dumbfounded co-host Dick Martin watched. For his third appearance on Laugh-In, (season 1, episode 14, aired 4/22/1968) Tiny Tim entered blowing kisses, preceded by an elaborate procession of the cast and, after a short interview, he sang "Tiptoe Through the Tulips".

His first album, God Bless Tiny Tim, was released by Reprise Records in 1968 with an orchestrated version of "Tiptoe Through the Tulips" that reached No. 17 on the Billboard chart as a single. A second album, Tiny Tim's 2nd Album (1968), was followed by For All My Little Friends (1969), a collection of children's songs that received a 1970 Grammy Award nomination.  Other charting singles included "Bring Back Those Rockabye Baby Days" at No. 95 and "Great Balls of Fire" at No. 85 in 1968 and 1969, respectively.

On October 7, 1969, Tiny Tim had the opportunity to take to the ice with his favorite Toronto Maple Leafs pro sports team before a charity event at the hockey shrine Maple Leaf Gardens. Wearing the skates and jersey of future Hockey Hall of Fame member Pat Quinn and helped by team members Mike Walton and Jim McKenny, he made an attempt to skate for the very first time. He was quoted as saying, "What a thrill! Just being on the ice was great!" Reacting well to his evidenced inability to skate on his own, he said, "I was always athletic spiritually, not physically".

Tiny Tim was married three times, and had one daughter from his first marriage to the then 17-year-old Victoria Budingeralso known as "Miss Vicki"at the age of 37. Tiny Tim married Miss Vicki on The Tonight Show Starring Johnny Carson on December 17, 1969, with 40 million people watching. In 1971, Budinger gave birth to their daughter Tulip Victoria. Tiny Tim and Victoria Budinger divorced three years later. Budinger subsequently had several marriages.

Tiny Tim married Jan Alweiss ("Miss Jan") in 1984, and Susan Marie Gardner ("Miss Sue") in 1995. Gardner was a 39-year-old Harvard graduate and a fan of Tim's since she was 12.

When Tiny Tim first became well known to the American public, many people erroneously believed that he was British. Many pundits and journalists debated whether the character being presented was just an orchestrated act or the real thing. "It quickly became clear that he was genuine", however, and that he could probably be best described as "a lonely outcast intoxicated by fame" and "a romantic" always in pursuit of his ideal dream.

After his career highlights in the late 1960s, Tiny Tim's television appearances dwindled, and his popularity began to wane. He continued to play concerts, making several lucrative appearances in Las Vegas. In August 1970, he performed "There'll Always Be an England" to an estimated 600,000 people at the Isle of Wight Festival 1970. The UK press announced that he had stolen the show "without a single electric instrument". When his recording contract ended with Reprise, he founded his own record label and named it Vic Tim Records, as a pun on the combination of his wife's name with that of his own. He performed with the American alternative rock band Camper Van Beethoven in 1986. He played the lead role in the 1987 horror film Blood Harvest, acting the role of Mervo. In the 1990s, he released several albums, including Rock (1993), I Love Me (1993), and Girl (1996), and also appeared in the 1997 comedy film Private Parts, which was filmed a few months before he died.

Tiny Tim, a biography by Harry Stein, was published in 1976 by Playboy Press. Khaury also appeared in the WWE on July 19, 1993, in a skit with Jerry Lawler on "King's Court".

Instruments 
Tiny Tim played the ukulele left-handedthough he retained the standard string placementand played the guitar right-handed. The instruments he played included a vintage Martin, a Favilla, and a Johnston metal resonator. Tiny was a huge fan of Arthur Godfrey and taught himself to play using a method book that came with the Godfrey-endorsed Maccaferri Islander plastic ukulele.

Death

On September 28, 1996, Khaury recorded a video interview at the Montague Bookmill. He later suffered a heart attack at a ukulele festival at the nearby Montague Grange Hall in Montague, Massachusetts. He was hospitalized at the nearby Franklin County Medical Center in Greenfield for approximately three weeks before being discharged with strong admonitions not to perform again because of his health, weight, and dietary needs for his diabetic and heart conditions. He ignored the advice.

On November 30, 1996, he was playing at a gala benefit hosted by the Women's Club of Minneapolis. He had let his third wife ("Miss Sue") know before the show that he was not feeling well, but did not want to disappoint his fans. Before the start of his performance, most of the audience had left. While performing his last number of the evening, he suffered another heart attack on stage in the middle of a rendition of his hit, "Tiptoe Through the Tulips". His wife asked him if he was feeling all right, and he said he was not; she was helping him back to their table where he collapsed, and never regained consciousness. EMTs performed on-site CPR and transported him to Hennepin County Medical Center, where after repeated revival attempts, he was pronounced dead at 11:20 pm. His remains are entombed in a mausoleum in Lakewood Cemetery in Minneapolis. A large mural of Tiny Tim with tulip themes by famous Australian artist Martin Sharp is in the Macquarie University Student Council in Sydney, Australia.

Posthumous releases
In 2000, the Rhino Handmade label released the posthumous Tiny Tim Live at the Royal Albert Hall. This recording had been made in 1968 at the height of Tiny Tim's fame, but Reprise Records never released it. The limited-number CD sold out and was reissued on Rhino's regular label. In 2009, the Collector's Choice label released I've Never Seen a Straight Banana: Rare Moments Vol. 1, produced and recorded by Richard Barone in 1976. The album was a collection of rare recordings of some of Tiny Tim's favorite songs from 1878 through the 1930s, along with some of his own compositions.

In 2009, it was reported that Justin Martell was preparing a biography of Tiny Tim, released in 2016 under the title Eternal Troubadour: The Improbable Life of Tiny Tim. Martell is called one of America's "foremost experts" on Tiny Tim; he contributed liner notes to I've Never Seen a Straight Banana and the 2011 Tiny Tim compilation LP Tiny Tim: Lost & Found 1963–1974 (Rare & Unreleased), released on Secret Seven Records.

In 2013, a biography of Tiny Tim was released in two editions. Tiny Tim: Tiptoe Through A Lifetime was released July 16, 2013, and is by Lowell Tarling (author) and Martin Sharp (illustrator). Ship To Shore PhonoCo followed up Lost & Found Vol 1 with a Vol 2 featuring Tiny Tim's 1974 live recording of "(Nobody Else Can Love Me Like) My Old Tomato Can" on a limited edition wax cylinder.

In 2016, Ship To Shore PhonoCo released Tiny Tim's America, a collection of demos recorded by Tiny Tim in 1974 and finished in 2015 with overdubs overseen by producer Richard Barone and Tiny Tim's cousin Eddie Rabin. The album was subtitled "Rare Moments Vol. 2" and was presented as a spiritual sequel to 2009's I've Never Seen A Straight Banana: Rare Moments Vol 1.

In 2020, Swedish journalist and documentary film-maker Johan von Sydow released the documentary film Tiny Tim: King for a Day.

Honors and awards
Tiny Tim was honored with a star on the outside mural of the Minneapolis nightclub First Avenue, recognizing performers that have played sold-out shows or have otherwise demonstrated a major contribution to the culture at the iconic venue. Receiving a star "might be the most prestigious public honor an artist can receive in Minneapolis," according to journalist Steve Marsh.

Discography

Studio albums 
God Bless Tiny Tim (Reprise Records, 1968)
Tiny Tim's 2nd Album (Reprise Records, 1968)
For All My Little Friends (Reprise Records, 1969), Nominated for a Grammy Award.
Wonderful World of Romance (Street of Dreams YPRX 1724, 1980) 
Chameleon (Street of Dreams YPRX 1848, 1980) 
The Eternal Troubadour (Playback PBL 123441, 1986)
Tiptoe Through The Tulips: Resurrection (Bear Family Records BCD 15409, 1988)
Leave Me Satisfied (NLT 1993, 1989), Unreleased
Tiny Tim Rock (Regular Records, 1993)
I Love Me (Yucca Tree Records, 1993)
Songs of an Impotent Troubadour (Durtro, 1994)
Tiny Tim's Christmas Album 1994 (Rounder Records, 1994)
Prisoner of Love: A Tribute to Russ Columbo (Vinyl Retentive Productions, 1995)
Girl (with Brave Combo) (Rounder Records, 1996)

Compilation albums 

 With Love and Kisses from Tiny Tim: Concert in Fairyland (Bouquet SLP 711, 1962) 
 God Bless Tiny Tim: The Complete Reprise Studio Masters...And More (Rhino Handmade, 2006, 3-CD set)
 Wonderful World of Romance (Zero Communications, TTWW 12062, 2006, recorded in 1979)
 Stardust (Zero Communications, TTST 12063, 2006)
I've Never Seen a Straight Banana – Rare Moments Vol. 1 (Collectors Choice Music WWCCM 20582) (2009)
Tiny Tim: Lost & Found (Rare & Unreleased 1963–1974) (Secret Seven Records, 2011, compilation)
Tiny Tim's America (Ship to Shore Phonograph Company, 2016, previously unreleased)

Live albums 

 World Non-Stop Singing Record Brighton 1988 (1988)
 Live in Chicago with the New Duncan Imperials (1995, Pravda Records)
 Tiny Tim Unplugged (Tomanna 51295, 1996) 
The Eternal Troubadour: Tiny Tim Live in London (Durtro, 1997, recorded in 1995)
Tiny Tim Live! At the Royal Albert Hall (Rhino Handmade, 2000, recorded in 1968)

Guest appearances 

 The Beatles' 1968 Christmas Record (Lyntone, LYN 1743/4, 1968)
 The Heart Album (Ca-Song CA 1369, 1991)

Singles 

 "April Showers" / "Little Girl" (Blue Cat 127, 1966)
 "Be My Love" / "Oh How I Miss You Tonight" (Boquet 101, 1968)
 "On The Good Ship Lollipop" / "Don't Take Your Love from Me" (Boquet 102, 1968)
 "Tip-Toe Thru' the Tulips with Me" /"Fill Your Heart" (Reprise 0679, 1968) #17
 "Bring Back Those Rockabye Baby Days" / "This Is All I Ask" (Reprise 0760, 1968) #95
 "Hello, Hello" / "The Other Side" (Reprise 0769, 1968)
 "Great Balls of Fire" / "As Time Goes By" (Reprise 0802, 1969) #85
 "On The Good Ship Lollipop" / "America I Love You" (Reprise 0837, 1969)
 "Neighborhood Children" / "Mickey The Monkey" (Reprise 0855, 1969)
 "I'm A Lonesome Little Raindrop" / "What the World Needs Now Is Love" (Reprise 0867, 1969)
 "Don't Bite the Hand That's Feeding You" / "What Kind of American Are You?" (Reprise 0939, 1970)
 "Tiptoe Through the Tulips" / "Don't Bite the Hand That's Feeding You" (Reprise 0740, 1970)
 "Why" / "The Spaceship Song" (Reprise 0985, 1971)
 "'Hendrix-Joplin-Morrison' Why Did They Have to Die So Young" / "Letter Edged in Black" (Vic Tim 777, 1971)
 "(Whispering Voices) The Ballad of Attica Prison" / "Prisoner's Song" (Vic Tim 778, 1971)
 "Rudolph The Red-Nosed Reindeer" / "White Christmas" (Vic Tim 1001, 1971)
 "Tip-Toe Thru' the Tulips with Me" / "Great Balls of Fire" (Reprise 0740)
 "Am I Just Another Pretty Face" / "Movies" (Scepter 12351, 1972)
 "I Ain't Got No Money" / "Alice Blue Gown" (Toilet 101, 1973)
 "Tip Toe to the Gas Pumps" / "The Hickey (On Your Neck)" (Clouds Records, 1979)

EP 

 Keeping My Troubles to Myself (1983)

Discography notes

References

External links

 Photos of Tiny Tim by Robert Whitaker
 
 Tiny Tim with Bob Dylan and The Band
 Tiny Tim's tomb at Roadside America
 
 Tiny Tim discography at tinytim.org
 FBI Records: The Vault – Herbert Khaury (Tiny Tim) at fbi.gov
 

1932 births
1996 deaths
20th-century American singers
American novelty song performers
American people of Belarusian-Jewish descent
American people of Lebanese descent
American people of Polish-Jewish descent
American ukulele players
Apex Records artists
Burials at Lakewood Cemetery
Countertenors
George Washington Educational Campus alumni
Jewish American musicians
Musicians from Minneapolis
Musicians from New York City
Musicians who died on stage
Outsider musicians
People from Manhattan
Reprise Records artists
20th-century American male singers